Immortal is a Norwegian black metal band from Bergen. The group was founded in 1991 by frontman and guitarist Abbath Doom Occulta (Olve Eikemo) and guitarist Demonaz Doom Occulta (Harald Nævdal). The pair worked with various drummers (including Grim, Armagedda and Hellhammer), and were later joined by former drummer Horgh (Reidar Horghagen) in 1996.

In March 2015, long-serving member Abbath announced his departure from the group following a dispute with the other members of the band, and he went on to form a new band under his name called Abbath. It was initially reported that following Abbath's departure, the band would split up. However, In August 2015, Demonaz and Horgh said that the band would continue without Abbath. Demonaz would return to playing guitar with the band for the first time since 1997, and would do vocals as well. Northern Chaos Gods was officially released on 6 July 2018 under Nuclear Blast Records. Although the band has been a trio for most of its history, several albums have been recorded as a duo, with varying combinations of Abbath, Demonaz, and Horgh.

History

First three albums (1991–1996)
Immortal arose from two short-lived bands, Old Funeral and Amputation, which were formed by Abbath and others in 1988. Immortal's original lineup consisted of ex-members from both of these bands. Old Funeral was founded by Abbath and Tore (Tore Bratseth), then went through a string of guitarists (including Demonaz, Varg Vikernes and Jørn Inge Tunsberg) until disbanding in 1992. Demonaz and Jørn formed Amputation, which released two demos with Demonaz on guitar and vocals, Jørn on guitars, and Padden on drums, before disbanding in 1990.

Members of Old Funeral and Amputation formed Immortal in 1991, with Abbath on bass and lead vocals, Demonaz on guitar, Jørn on guitar and Armagedda on drums. The music on their early demo recordings was death metal, with lyrics influenced by Morbid Angel and Possessed. The band then became influenced by Euronymous and bands like Bathory and Celtic Frost. They released their self-titled EP in 1991, which saw a stylistic change to black metal. This was followed by their debut album Diabolical Fullmoon Mysticism in 1992. Immortal's early full-length releases were in traditional black metal style, but their most acclaimed album, At the Heart of Winter, marks the period when the band began to experiment with a complex fusion of black metal and German thrash metal, resulting in the sound of Immortal's later works.

In 1995, the band released two video clips directed by British artist David Palser, entitled Masters of Nebulah Frost, through Osmose Productions. They featured many bizarrely-shot images of frozen landscapes and vast forests with the band performing two songs from the album Battles in the North, "Grim and Frostbitten Kingdoms" and "Blashyrkh (Mighty Ravendark)", on a Norwegian mountainside. The video for "Grim and Frostbitten Kingdoms" features Mayhem drummer, Hellhammer (Jan Axel Blomberg). These clips have become the template for many other bands producing such works, similarly to how "The Call of the Wintermoon" is also highly influential.

Blizzard Beasts and At the Heart of Winter (1996–1999)

Apart from the two core members, Abbath and Demonaz, Immortal did not find a stable lineup until 1996, when drummer Horgh joined the band and is credited on their album, Blizzard Beasts. A major turning point for the band was in 1997 when Demonaz suffered acute tendinitis in his arm and was unable to continue playing, and Abbath took over for guitar. Despite this, Demonaz continued writing lyrics and has been a manager for the band, accompanying them on tour, releasing updates and giving interviews about how things are progressing with the band. Abbath and Horgh wrote and recorded the band's next album, At the Heart of Winter. During the tours for this album, the band recruited Iscariah to stand in for bass duties, and made him a full-time member.

Grim committed suicide in 1999; however, it is said that this was unrelated to his departure from Immortal and rather to his history of manic depression and suicide attempts. The band frequently headlines (as recently as 2007) a festival held in his memory, the Hole in the Sky festival.

Damned in Black and Sons of Northern Darkness (2000–2003)
The next album, Damned in Black was more similar to their old style. It was well received, but is frequently overlooked as it came between two of their classic albums, At the Heart of Winter and Sons of Northern Darkness. In 2000, the EP Immortal was repackaged as part of the True Kings of Norway compilation by Spinefarm Records. Also in 2000, Immortal signed a record contract with German label Nuclear Blast; this change to a more prominent record company didn't affect their style, a fact proven by their record Sons of Northern Darkness. Two months after this, Iscariah announced his intention to leave the band and was replaced by Saroth for the next few months.

Split (2003–2007) 
Immortal decided to split during the summer of 2003 for various personal reasons of the band members. However, in mid-October 2005, Abbath, Demonaz, and original Immortal drummer Armagedda reunited, and along with Gorgoroth bassist King ov Hell and Enslaved guitarist Ice Dale (Arve Isdal), they began work on a new project, dubbed I. This new band entered the studio at the end of April 2006 to record their debut album, Between Two Worlds, released in November 2006. Demonaz also features as lyricist for the band.

In early June 2006, German magazine Rock Hard reported that Abbath, Demonaz and Horgh had decided to resurrect Immortal and start touring again in 2007. Abbath is quoted as saying:

Reunion and All Shall Fall (2007–2014) 
In 2007, Immortal reunited for a string of summer shows. They headlined the Inferno Festival in April, the Tuska Open Air festival in June/July, Metal Camp festival in July, and the Wacken Open Air festival in August. They also performed twice in the United States in July 2007. Filling in as bassist for these dates was Aura Noir bassist Apollyon. Immortal first toured Australia and New Zealand in March 2008.

After the reunion, Abbath and Horgh decided to reform the band on a permanent basis. This was confirmed by Demonaz in an interview with Eternal Terror. Apollyon was the permanent replacement for Iscariah, and the three began working with Demonaz on material for their next album All Shall Fall. All Shall Fall was recorded in April–May 2009, and was released on 25 September 2009.

According to Decibel magazine's interview, work had begun on Immortal's ninth album stating in the article "four new songs already in the works for a follow-up to All Shall Fall".

Abbath and Demonaz were interviewed in the 2009 American documentary by Aaron Aites and Audrey Ewell, Until the Light Takes Us.

Legal battle, Abbath's exit, and Northern Chaos Gods (2014–2020) 
The members of Immortal were involved in a legal battle with each other over the rights to the Immortal trademark. They were also due to submit a new album to the Nuclear Blast label, though little information regarding the album and its release had been disclosed. It is confirmed, however, by Abbath that the album had been completed with the aid of various musicians.

In March 2015, Abbath left Immortal as a result of this conflict and an inability to move forward. Abbath has continued to record and perform as a solo act under his name.

On 8 January 2018, the band posted via Facebook an update on Immortal's upcoming ninth full-length, stating "We have put a massive amount of energy into this, and wanted to deliver our absolutely best.
It has been a pleasure to finish the studio process and most of all being stoked about the final result. Peter Tägtgren has done an outstanding job in producing and mixing it. We now look forward to have it released, and are excited to share our 9th full length with you all." The album was released under Nuclear Blast Records as Northern Chaos Gods on 6 July 2018. The album features original member Demonaz on vocals and guitar.

Legal battle, Horgh's exit, and War Against All (2020–present) 
In August 2020, it was announced that Demonaz and Horgh were involved with a legal dispute over the rights to the band's name. Demonaz had registered the name with the Norwegian Patent Office as his exclusive trademark in July 2019, which was approved; however, Horgh chose to appeal the registration, and the matter was ruled in his favor, meaning that Demonaz no longer has the exclusive right to the Immortal name. Horgh was unaware of the initial sole registration made by Demonaz.

On October 24, 2022, the band announced that their tenth studio album, War Against All, would be released in 2023. It was also revealed that Demonaz was listed as the only member of the band, indicating that he won the dispute of the rights to the band's name against Horgh.

Lyrical style
Immortal's lyrics are based on an overall theme, a realm called Blashyrkh which is said to be "demon-and-battle-filled" and a "fusion of gothic, Nordic, and heroic themes." The idea for Blashyrkh came about from Demonaz and Abbath's feelings of isolation living in Bergen. They created Blashyrkh to mirror those feelings, basing it on Norway, including "winter landscapes", "the woods, the mountains, the darkness, the fog", and "glacial valleys". When writing lyrics, the band's lyricist Demonaz often takes long walks in the Norwegian countryside near his hometown of Bergen for inspiration. Unlike many early black metal bands, Immortal does not have satanic-themed lyrics, opting instead for basing the genre's inherent concepts of darkness and evil in the fantasy setting of Blashyrkh. However, on the band's first album, there were a few satanic references but without any lyrics attacking religion.

Discography

Studio albums
 Diabolical Fullmoon Mysticism (1992)
 Pure Holocaust (1993)
 Battles in the North (1995)
 Blizzard Beasts (1997)
 At the Heart of Winter (1999)
 Damned in Black (2000)
 Sons of Northern Darkness (2002)
 All Shall Fall (2009)
 Northern Chaos Gods (2018)
 War Against All (2023)

Other releases
  Untitled demo (1991)
 Immortal (EP, 1991)
 Masters of Nebulah Frost (VHS, 1995)
 True Kings of Norway (5-way split, 2000)
 Live at BB Kings Club New York (DVD, 2003)
 Valley of the Damned / Hordes of War (2-way split, 2009)
 The Seventh Date of Blashyrkh (DVD, 2010)

Members

Current members
 Demonaz Doom Occulta (Harald Nævdal) – lyrics (1991–present), guitars (1991–1997, 2015–present), vocals (2015–present)

Past members
 Abbath Doom Occulta (Olve Eikemo) – vocals (1991–2015), guitars (1998–2015), bass (1991–1998), studio drums (1993–1995)
 Jørn Inge Tunsberg – guitars (1991)
 Armagedda (Gerhard Herfindal) – drums (1991–1992)
 Grim (Erik Brødreskift) – drums (1993–1994; died 1999)
 Horgh (Reidar Horghagen) – drums (1996–2022)
 Iscariah (Stian Smørholm) – bass (1999–2002)
 Apollyon (Ole Jørgen Moe) – bass (2006–2015)

Live members
 Kolgrim (a.k.a. Padden) (Jan Atle Åserød) – drums (1992–1993)
 Hellhammer (Jan Axel Blomberg) – drums (1995)
 Ares (Ronny Hovland) – bass (1998)
 Saroth (Yngve Liljebäck) – bass (2002–2003)

Timeline

References

External links
 

Norwegian black metal musical groups
Musical groups established in 1990
Musical groups disestablished in 2003
Musical groups reestablished in 2006
1990 establishments in Norway
Musical groups from Bergen
Nuclear Blast artists